Pseudogomphus is a genus of fungi in the family Gomphaceae. A monotypic genus, it contains the single species Pseudogomphus fragilissimus, found in Gabon.

References

Fungi of Africa
Gomphaceae
Monotypic Basidiomycota genera